Holopus is a genus of echinoderms belonging to the family Holopodidae.

The species of this genus are found in Central America, Pacific Ocean (near Australia).

Species:

Holopus alidis 
Holopus mikihe 
Holopus rangii

References

Cyrtocrinida
Crinoid genera